John Sherare (fl. 1378–1395) of Chichester, Sussex, was an English politician

He was a Member (MP) of the Parliament of England for Chichester in
October 1377, January 1380, 1381, May 1382, October 1382, October 1383, November 1384, 1385, 1386, January 1390, 1391, 1393 and 1395 and for Lewes in 1378.

References

Year of birth missing
Year of death missing
English MPs October 1377
People from Chichester
English MPs January 1380
English MPs 1381
English MPs May 1382
English MPs October 1382
English MPs October 1383
English MPs November 1384
English MPs 1385
English MPs 1386
English MPs January 1390
English MPs 1391
English MPs 1393
English MPs 1395
English MPs 1378